Boumba-et-Ngoko is a department of East Province in Cameroon. The department covers an area of 30,389 km and as of 2001 had a total population of 116,702. The capital of the department lies at Yokadouma.

Subdivisions
The department is divided administratively into 4 communes and in turn into villages.

Communes 
 Gari-Gombo
 Moloundou
 Salapoumbé
 Yokadouma

See also
Communes of Cameroon

References

Departments of Cameroon
East Region (Cameroon)